is a railway station in Kita-ku, Nagoya, Aichi Prefecture, Japan

Lines

 (Station number: M10)

Layout

Platforms

Platform Map
The following is a map of the platform and the car placement.

Internal Station Map
(map to come)
Blue denotes upward moving escalators.
Pink denotes downward moving escalators.

External Exit Placement
(map to come)

Disabled or Injured Route Information
From either platform, there are elevators to the east wicket (exit 1 & 4). From the east wicket, there is an elevator to ground level off exit 1. 
Both escalators from the platform for Ozone are upward moving. Both escalators from the platform for Sakae are upward moving. 
 All exits are stairwells.

References

External links
 

Railway stations in Japan opened in 1971
Railway stations in Aichi Prefecture